Wernick is a surname. Notable people with the surname include:

Jeffrey Wernick (1953–2009), American animation executive and sports agent
Mickey Wernick (born 1944), English retired bookmaker and professional poker player from Birmingham
Paul Wernick, American television and film producer and screenwriter
Pete Wernick, (born 1946), also known by many as "Dr. Banjo", American musician
Richard Wernick (born 1934), US composer from Boston, Massachusetts